is a subway station on the  (operated by Tokyo Metro). It is located in the Kodenmachō neighborhood of Nihonbashi, Chūō, Tokyo, Japan. Its number is H-15.

Station layout 
Kodemmacho Station has two platforms separated by two tracks. Track 1 is for passengers traveling toward ,  and Naka-Meguro Stations. Track 2 serves those heading toward  and Kita-senju Stations.

Around the station 
The station serves the Kodemmachō neighborhood. The area has many office buildings. The boundary of Chūō and Chiyoda wards is nearby.

The Sōbu Rapid Line passes underneath Kodemmachō. However, it does not stop at the station. Passengers that want to transfer on to the Sōbu Line from Kodemmachō can walk to Bakurochō Station or Shin-Nihombashi Station, which are both less than ten minutes away on foot.

History 
Kodemmacho Station opened on May 31, 1962.

On March 20, 1995, four people died on the station platform as victims of the Sarin gas attack on the Tokyo subway.

The station facilities were inherited by Tokyo Metro after the privatization of the Teito Rapid Transit Authority (TRTA) in 2004.

References

Railway stations in Japan opened in 1962
Railway stations in Tokyo
Tokyo Metro Hibiya Line
Stations of Tokyo Metro
Nihonbashi, Tokyo